Eduardo Chávez (1898–1982) was a Mexican engineer and politician.
He was in charge of doing the rivers of the north of Tamaulipas, Mexico.
He was contracted by the president of Mexico (Lazaro Cardenas) in those years to do it.
He was the great grandfather of Brándi Chavez

20th-century Mexican engineers
1898 births
1982 deaths
People from Mexico City